Aatishbazi ishq is a Drama Film, Punjabi film directed by Amit Subhash Dhawan and starring Mahie Gill and Roshan Prince with a released date of 14 October 2016.

Cast
Mahie Gill 
Roshan Prince
Kulbhushan Kharbanda 
B.N. Sharma 
Tanya Abrol 
Introducing : Ravinder

Soundtrack

References

External links 
 
 

2016 films
Punjabi-language Indian films
2010s Punjabi-language films